Éamonn Hanrahan (born 1978) is an Irish retired Gaelic footballer who played as a midfielder for the Tipperary senior team.

Born in Clonmel, County Tipperary, Hanrahan first arrived on the inter-county scene at the age of nineteen when he first linked up with the Tipperary under-21 team. He joined the senior panel during the 2000 championship. Hanrahan immediately became a regular member of the starting fifteen and won one Tommy Murphy Cup medal.

At club level Hanrahan is a one-time Munster medallist with University College Cork. In addition to this he also won championship medals with UCC and Clonmel Commercials.

Hanrahan announced his retirement from inter-county football on 7 January 2010.

Honours

Player

Clonmel Commercials
Tipperary Senior Club Football Championship (1): 2002, 2012

University College Cork
Munster Senior Club Football Championship (1): 1999
Cork Senior Club Football Championship (1): 1999

Tipperary
Tommy Murphy Cup (1): 2005
McGrath Cup (1): 2003

References

1978 births
Living people
Clonmel Commercials Gaelic footballers
UCC Gaelic footballers
Tipperary inter-county Gaelic footballers